The Sylhet MAG Osmani Medical College (SOMC) is a government medical school in Bangladesh, established in 1962. It is located in Sylhet. Originally named "Sylhet Medical College", it was renamed in 1986 in the honour of General Muhammad Ataul Gani Osmani, commander-in-chief of Bangladesh Army during the Bangladesh Liberation War of 1971. The college is affiliated with Sylhet Medical University

Campus

The college and hospital extends over an area of  divided by newer and older construction. There are ten hostels (six male, four female) for student housing.

Academics
Sylhet MAG Osmani Medical College offers undergraduate and graduate level courses in a variety of medical specializations. All the courses are certified by the Shahjalal University of Science and Technology are recognized by the Bangladesh Medical and Dental Council.

The school publishes two academic journals which publish biannually
 Osmani Medical Teacher's Association Journal (OMTAJ)
 Bangladesh Medical Journal

Notable alumni
 Brigadier General Dr. Nurunnahar Fatema Begum, paediatric cardiologist
 Shafiqur Rahman, physician and Amir of the Bangladesh Jamaat-e-Islami
 Major General Nishat Jubaida, Commandant Armed Forces Institute of Pathology (AFIP)

Gallery

See also
 List of medical colleges in Bangladesh

References

Medical colleges in Bangladesh
Education in Sylhet
Hospitals in Bangladesh
Educational institutions established in 1962
1962 establishments in East Pakistan
Organisations based in Sylhet